Carbonyl selenide is the chemical compound with the formula OCSe.  It is a colorless linear molecule that is primarily of interest for research purposes.

Properties

Carbonyl selenide is a colorless gas with an unpleasant odor. Although the compound is quite stable, its solutions gradually revert to elemental selenium and carbon monoxide.

Synthesis and reactions
Carbonyl selenide can be produced by treating selenium with carbon monoxide in the presence of amines.

It is used in organoselenium chemistry as a means of incorporating selenium into organic compounds, e.g. for the preparation of selenocarbamates.

References

Inorganic carbon compounds
Oxides
Selenides